Robert Zarinsky (September 2, 1940  November 28, 2008) was a convicted murderer and suspected serial killer from Linden, New Jersey.

Criminal record
After a series of lesser crimes and numerous stays in psychiatric institutions:

In 1975, Zarinsky was sentenced to life imprisonment for the 1969 murder of Rosemary Calandriello, 17, of Atlantic Highlands, New Jersey.
In 2001, he was acquitted of the 1958 murder of Rahway, New Jersey police officer Charles Bernoskie.
In 2008, Zarinsky was indicted for the 1968 murder of Jane Durrua, 13, of Middletown, New Jersey, but he died before the trial could begin.
In 2016, it was announced that DNA evidence conclusively linked Zarinsky to the 1965 murder of Mary Agnes Klinsky, 18, of Raritan High School.
He was also the prime suspect in the 1969–1974 murders of:
 Linda Balabanow, 17, of Union Township, Union County, New Jersey
 Doreen Carlucci, 14, and Joanne Delardo, 15, of Woodbridge Township, New Jersey
 Ann Logan, 19, of Elizabeth, New Jersey

Zarinsky repeatedly boasted that he could solve up to ten homicides, hoping to parlay the information into a more-lenient prison sentence.

Calandriello murder
Rosemary Calandriello was a 17-year-old girl from Atlantic Highlands, New Jersey, who disappeared on August 25, 1969. Her body was never found, but Zarinsky was convicted in 1975 of murdering her. He was sentenced to life imprisonment for this crime, upheld on appeal. He was the first person in New Jersey ever to be convicted of murder without the victim's body having been found, a conviction upheld on appeal.

In 1988, Zarinsky claimed that he had accidentally killed Calandriello and buried her body in northwest New Jersey. He later claimed that he had thrown her body into the Atlantic Ocean.

Bernoskie murder 

In 2001, Zarinsky was tried and acquitted of the November 28, 1958, murder of Rahway police officer Charles Bernoskie.

Bernoskie happened to come upon a burglary in progress at the Miller Pontiac car dealership in Rahway. He was then shot and killed by one of the burglars, either Zarinsky or his cousin Theodore Schiffer. Although Bernoskie shot both suspects, they were able to elude capture. No one was charged with the murder until 1999.

Schiffer left a fingerprint at the scene of the Miller Pontiac burglary, but it was not until 1999 that the fingerprint was matched to him. He had never been fingerprinted and therefore there was no record of his fingerprints. Schiffer pleaded guilty to burglary and served three years in prison.

Schiffer was implicated as an accomplice in the burglary and murder, in testimony from Zarinsky's sister, Judith Sapsa, who was under investigation for embezzling $121,500 from a mutual fund account owned by Zarinsky. Sapsa testified at the Bernoskie murder trial that she had assisted her mother with removing bullets from Zarinsky and Schiffer on the night of the Bernoskie murder. Sapsa also testified that Zarinsky stated to her that "Teddy and I shot a cop." Despite the testimony of Schiffer and Sapsa, their credibility and motives were questioned, and Zarinsky was acquitted of the Bernoskie murder.

When Zarinsky was indicted in 2000 for the murder, Bette Bernoskie, the widow of Officer Charles Bernoskie, filed a wrongful-death suit against Zarinsky in civil court. In August 2003, a jury found Zarinsky responsible for the death and awarded Bette Bernoskie $9,500,000 plus interest. In 2004, $154,000 was seized from Zarinsky's assets, and Bette Bernoskie divided this award among her legal representatives and her six children.

In July 2007, a New Jersey Appellate Court reversed the decision and ordered the money returned to Zarinsky, citing his inability to put on a proper defense. Bette Bernoskie no longer had the money, and the New Jersey Patrolmen's Benevolent Association then organized efforts to repay it. It was their intention that neither Bette Bernoskie nor her children would ever give back the award money.

Durrua murder
On March 11, 2008, a grand jury returned an indictment against Zarinsky for the 1968 murder of 13-year-old Jane Durrua, based on DNA evidence. Durrua went missing on the evening of November 4, 1968, and her body was found the next morning in a field in Middletown, New Jersey.

Klinsky murder
On February 17, 2016, the New Jersey State Police Major Crime Unit and the Monmouth County Prosecutor's Office announced that newly examined DNA evidence linked the 1965 death of Mary Agnes Klinsky to Zarinsky.  Klinsky was raped and beaten to death.  Her naked body was found near Telegraph Hill Park in Holmdel, New Jersey on September 16, 1965.

Zarinsky's death
On November 28, 2008, before he could stand trial for the Durrua murder, Zarinsky died at the South Woods State Prison in Bridgeton, New Jersey, of pulmonary fibrosis, a scarring of the lung tissue that made it increasingly difficult for him to breathe.

See also

Crime in New Jersey
List of murder convictions without a body
List of serial killers in the United States

References

1940 births
2008 deaths
American male criminals
American murderers of children
American rapists
American people convicted of murder
American people who died in prison custody
American prisoners sentenced to life imprisonment
Deaths from pulmonary fibrosis
Murder convictions without a body
People convicted of murder by New Jersey
People from Linden, New Jersey
Prisoners sentenced to life imprisonment by New Jersey
Prisoners who died in New Jersey detention
Suspected serial killers